Gouttières is the name of two communes in France:

Gouttières, Eure
Gouttières, Puy-de-Dôme